Mehdi Ben Mrad (born 6 June 1998) is a Tunisian footballer who plays as a goalkeeper for Stade Tunisien.

Club career
Following an injury to Kaïs Amdouni, Ben Mrad was named first choice goalkeeper in his absence, standing in for eight games in the 2018–19 season.

In September 2020, Ben Mrad moved to AS Oued Ellil on loan. However, in October of the same year, he was loaned to EO Sidi Bouzid.

He returned to the Stade Tunisien first team ahead of the 2022–23 season.

Career statistics

Club

Notes

References

1998 births
Living people
Tunisian footballers
Association football goalkeepers
Tunisian Ligue Professionnelle 1 players
Stade Tunisien players
EO Sidi Bouzid players